This page covers all the important events in the sport of tennis in 2010. Primarily, it provides the results of notable tournaments throughout the year on both the ATP and WTA Tours, the Davis Cup, and the Fed Cup.

ITF

Grand Slam events

Just five male players reached at least the third round of all four grand slams: Roger Federer, Rafael Nadal, Novak Djokovic, Andy Murray and Albert Montañés. Only Federer, Nadal, and Djokovic reached the fourth round at all four major, but all three also reached all four quarterfinals.
Just six female players reached at least the third round of all four grand slams: Caroline Wozniacki, Venus Williams, Jelena Janković, Yanina Wickmayer, Maria Kirilenko, and Alona Bondarenko. Only Wozniacki and Williams reached the fourth round of all four majors.

Davis Cup
World Group Draw

S-Seeded
U-Unseeded
 * Choice of ground

Fed Cup

World Group Draw

S-Seeded
U-Unseeded
 * Choice of ground

Important events

January
Nikolay Davydenko became the second player to beat both Roger Federer and Rafael Nadal in the same tournament on separate occasions en route to winning the 2010 Qatar ExxonMobil Open.
Justine Henin made her return to the WTA Tour by competing in and reaching the final of the 2010 Brisbane International.
By winning the 2010 Australian Open, Serena Williams tied Billie Jean King with 12 Grand Slam Singles titles.
Roger Federer won his 16th Grand Slam Singles title (at the Australian Open) to improve his record of most Grand Slam Singles titles won by a man in the open era.
Andy Roddick, Kim Clijsters, Marin Čilić,  Yanina Wickmayer, Marcos Baghdatis, Elena Dementieva, John Isner, and Alona Bondarenko also won titles.

February
By successfully defending his title in Zagreb, Marin Čilić opened 2010 with an impressive 15–1 record.
After being denied a visa the previous year, Shahar Pe'er reached the semi-finals of the 2010 Dubai Tennis Championships in a dream run, where she took out three seeded players, including top-seed Caroline Wozniacki.
Venus Williams earned her 42nd and 43rd career titles in Dubai and Acapulco, the most by an active player. She also defeated Svetlana Kuznetsova and Kim Clijsters to win the 2010 Billie Jean King Cup.
Chile decided to still plan to host its Davis Cup series against Israel despite the devastating earthquake that killed at least 700 people in the South American country.
Feliciano López, Thomaz Bellucci, Fernando Verdasco, Robin Söderling, Juan Carlos Ferrero(2), Elena Dementieva, Vera Zvonareva, Michaël Llodra, Ernests Gulbis, Sam Querrey, Maria Sharapova, Mariana Duque Mariño, Novak Djokovic, David Ferrer, and Alisa Kleybanova also won titles.

March
Anastasia Pavlyuchenkova won her first tour singles title in Monterrey.
Marco Chiudinelli was awarded the 2009 Comeback Player of the Year Award.
French officials stated that the French Open might leave Roland Garros, the tournament's home for 82 years, if improvements are not made to the infrastructure.
The 2009 WTA Awards were awarded on March 24 at the Sony Ericsson Open. Winners included the Williams Sisters, Yanina Wickmayer, Liezel Huber, Kim Clijsters, Melanie Oudin, and Elena Dementieva.

April
After a three-month hiatus due to knee injury, world number one Serena Williams announced  her return to take place at the 2010 Internazionali BNL d'Italia.
By successfully defending his title in Monte Carlo, Rafael Nadal became the first player in the open era to win six back to back titles at a single tournament.
Justine Henin won her first tournament since her comeback at the Porsche Tennis Grand Prix.
The Australian, Belgian, French, and Slovak Fed Cup teams won spots in the 2011 World Group.
Stanislas Wawrinka, Juan Ignacio Chela, Caroline Wozniacki, Flavia Pennetta, Samantha Stosur, Francesca Schiavone, Fernando Verdasco, and Iveta Benešová also won titles.

May
Organizers announced that the Madrid Open will be the first tennis tournament to be broadcast for the general public in 3D outside tournament grounds. 
Sam Querrey and John Isner set up the first all-American clay court final in 19 years at the Serbia Open, with Querrey being the victor.
By winning the 2010 Mutua Madrileña Madrid Open, Rafael Nadal broke three Open Era records. The win gave him a record 18 Masters Series career titles, made him the first player to hold all three clay court Masters Series events in the same season, and also made him the first player to win three consecutive Masters events.
By virtue of winning the Madrid Open, the Bryan Brothers matched the record for most doubles titles won in the open era with 61 titles.
Argentina defeated the United States in the World Team Cup final.
Mikhail Youzhny, Albert Montañés, Anastasija Sevastova, Richard Gasquet, Alexandra Dulgheru, and Maria Sharapova also won titles.

June
Justine Henin's record-tying streak of 40 consecutive sets won at the French Open was broken by Russian, Maria Sharapova, in the third round.(Occurred in May)
Roger Federer's open era record of 23 consecutive Grand Slam semifinals came to an end when he lost to Robin Söderling in the quarterfinals of the French Open.
Francesca Schiavone became the first Italian woman in the Open Era to reach the semifinal and final of and to win a Grand Slam at the French Open.
By winning the 2010 French Open, Rafael Nadal became the first man to qualify for the 2010 ATP World Tour Finals, as well as becoming the first man to complete 'the Clay Slam', by winning all 3 Masters 1000 titles (Monte Carlo, Rome and Madrid), as well as the French Open, in the same calendar year.
Serena Williams became the sixth woman to hold the number one rankings in both singles and doubles (with Venus Williams). It is also the first time in the Open Era that the number one ranked doubles team holds the first and second ranks in singles. The pair also became the third partnership in the women's game to hold all four Grand Slam titles at the same time.
Lleyton Hewitt, Sam Querrey, Li Na, Sergiy Stakhovsky, Michaël Llodra, Ekaterina Makarova, and Justine Henin also won titles.

July
John Isner defeated Nicolas Mahut 6–4, 3–6, 6–7(7), 7–6(3), 70–68 in the longest match in tennis history in the first round of Wimbledon. The match broke numerous records and was played over a course of three days. (Occurred in June)
Rafael Nadal won his 14th consecutive match at Wimbledon to earn his second Wimbledon title.
Serena Williams won her 13th Grand Slam title at Wimbledon, her fourth at the Championships.
Bob and Mike Bryan won their record 62nd doubles title as a team, surpassing The Woodies (Todd Woodbridge and Mark Woodforde), by defeating Eric Butorac and Jean-Julien Rojer in the final of the Farmers Classic.
Mardy Fish, Ágnes Szávay(2), Aravane Rezaï, Albert Montañés, Nicolás Almagro(2), Kaia Kanepi, Andrey Golubev, Anna Chakvetadze, Julia Görges, and Juan Carlos Ferrero also won titles.

August
Andy Roddick dropped to number eleven on August 8, and for the first time ever, no U.S. men were ranked inside the top ten on the ATP Tour.
For the first time since 1976 the top two ranked men in the world teamed up in a doubles event. Rafael Nadal and Novak Djokovic played together at the 2010 Rogers Cup.
Roger Federer became the second man to qualify for the ATP World Tour Finals.
Andy Murray and Caroline Wozniacki were the 2010 US Open Series champions.
Caroline Wozniacki won the inaugural e-Boks Danish Open.

September
 Rafael Nadal became the seventh man to win the career Grand Slam by defeating Novak Djokovic in the US Open final.
 Kim Clijsters won her 21st consecutive match at the US Open to successfully defend her 2009 title.
 Vania King and Yaroslava Shvedova won the doubles event at the US Open, accumulating an impressive 12–0 record at Grand Slam tournaments.
 The United States, Austrian, German, Swedish, Indian, Belgian, Kazakhstani, and Romanian Davis Cup teams won spots in the 2011 World Group.
 After an eight-month hiatus due to a wrist injury, 2009 US Open champ, Juan Martín del Potro, returned to the tour at the 2010 PTT Thailand Open.
 Caroline Wozniacki became the first woman to qualify for the WTA Tour Championships en route to her victory at the Toray Pan Pacific Open.
 Jarmila Groth, Tamira Paszek, Gilles Simon, Juan Ignacio Chela, Alisa Kleybanova, Alla Kudryavtseva, Guillermo García-López, and Mikhail Youzhny also won titles.

October
 Serena Williams, Kim Clijsters, and Vera Zvonareva became the next group of women to qualify for the WTA Tour Championships. Four days later, Francesca Schiavone and Samantha Stosur also qualified for the event. Venus Williams would have also qualified, but announced that her knee injury would keep her from competing for the remainder of the year. Three days after Schiavone and Stosur gained entry, Jelena Janković and Elena Dementieva rounded up the elite eight. On October 19, Serena Williams stated that because of a foot injury, she would not be able to compete in the event. By winning the Kremlin Cup, Victoria Azarenka became the final qualifier for the Championships.
Novak Djokovic became the third man to qualify for the ATP World Tour Finals. The following two weeks, Andy Murray and Robin Söderling also qualified.
 For the first time in 2010, all twenty of the top twenty ranked men competed in the same tournament at the Shanghai Masters. Andy Murray was the champion at the penultimate ATP World Tour Masters 1000 tournament.
Rafael Nadal, Ana Ivanovic, Tamarine Tanasugarn, Viktor Troicki, Roger Federer, Roberta Vinci, Mikhail Kukushkin, Jürgen Melzer, and Gaël Monfils also won titles.

November
 Italy won its second consecutive Fed Cup final, defeating the United States 3–1.
 Tomáš Berdych, David Ferrer, and Andy Roddick were the final qualifiers for the ATP World Tour Finals.
 David Ferrer, Roger Federer, and Robin Söderling also won titles.

December
The 2010 WTA Awards were awarded on December 1 at a press conference in St. Petersburg, Florida. Kim Clijsters was voted Player of the Year while Gisela Dulko and Flavia Pennetta were voted Doubles Team of the Year. Other winners included Petra Kvitová, Justine Henin, Elena Dementieva, and Maria Sharapova.
Novak Djokovic led Serbia to the country's first ever Davis Cup victory, after defeating France 3–2.
Rafael Nadal and Caroline Wozniacki, the year-end world number ones, were named the ITF World Champions for 2010.

International Tennis Hall of Fame
Class of 2010:
Mark Woodforde, player
Natasha Zvereva, player
Derek Hardwick, contributor
Brad Parks, contributor

References

External links
Official website of the Association of Tennis Professionals (ATP)
Official website of the Women's Tennis Association (WTA)
Official website of the International Tennis Federation (ITF)

 
Tennis by year